Yours, Mine and Ours is a 1968 American family comedy-drama film directed by Melville Shavelson and starring Lucille Ball, Henry Fonda and Van Johnson. Before its release, it had three other working titles: The Beardsley Story, Full House, and His, Hers, and Theirs.

It was based loosely on the story of Frank and Helen Beardsley, although Desilu Productions bought the rights to the story long before Helen's autobiographical book Who Gets the Drumstick? was released to bookstores. Screenwriters Madelyn Pugh and Bob Carroll wrote several I Love Lucy-style stunts that in most cases had no basis in the actual lives of the Beardsley family, before Melville Shavelson and Mort Lachman took over primary writing duties. The film was commercially successful, and even the Beardsleys themselves appreciated it.

Plot 
Frank Beardsley is a Navy Chief Warrant Officer, recently detached from the aircraft carrier USS Enterprise and assigned as project officer for the Fresnel lens glide-slope indicator, or "meatball," that would eventually become standard equipment on all carriers. Helen North is a civilian nurse working in the dispensary at NAS Alameda, the California U.S. Navy base to which Frank is assigned.

Frank meets Helen, first by chance in the commissary on the base and again when Frank brings his distraught teen-age daughter for treatment at the dispensary, where Helen informs him that the young lady is simply growing up in a too-crowded house that lacks a mother's guidance. They immediately hit it off and go on a date, all the while shying away from admitting their respective secrets: Frank has ten children and Helen has eight, from previous marriages ended by their spouses' deaths.

When each finally learns the other's secret, they initially resist their mutual attraction. But Chief Warrant Officer Darrell Harrison (Van Johnson) is determined to bring them together, so he "fixes up" each of them with a sure-to-be-incompatible  blind date. Helen's date is an obstetrician (Sidney Miller) who stands a good head shorter than she ("Darrell had a malicious sense of humor," Helen observes in voice-over); Frank's date is a "hip" girl (Louise Troy) who is not only young enough to be his daughter, but is also far too forward for his taste. As the final touch, Harrison makes sure that both dates take place in the same Japanese restaurant. As Harrison fully expects, Frank and Helen end up leaving the restaurant together in his car, with Frank's date sitting uncomfortably between them as they carry on about their children.

Frank and Helen continue to date regularly, and eventually he invites her to dinner in his home. This nearly turns disastrous when Mike, Rusty, and Greg (Tim Matheson, Gil Rogers, and Gary Goetzman), Frank's three sons, mix hefty doses of gin, scotch, and vodka into Helen's drink. As a result, Helen's behavior turns wild and embarrassing, which Frank cannot comprehend until he catches his sons trying to conceal their laughter. "The court of inquiry is now in session!" he declares, and gets the three to own up and apologize. After this, he announces his intention to marry Helen, adding, "And nobody put anything into my drink."

Most of the children oppose the union at first, regarding each other and their respective stepparents with suspicion. Eventually, however, the 18 children bond into one large blended family, about to increase—Helen becomes pregnant.

Further tension develops between young Philip North and his teacher at the parochial school that he attends: his teacher insists that he use his "legal" name, which remains North even after his mother marries Beardsley. This prompts Helen and Frank to discuss cross-adopting each other's children, who (except for Philip) are aghast at the notion of "reburying" their deceased biological parents. The subsequent birth of Joseph John Beardsley finally unites the children, who agree unanimously to adoption under a common surname.

The film ends with the eldest sibling, Mike Beardsley, going off to Camp Pendleton to begin his stint in the United States Marine Corps.

Cast 

 Henry Fonda as CWO Frank Beardsley, USN
 Lucille Ball as Helen Beardsley
 Van Johnson as CWO Darrell Harrison, USN
 Walter Brooke as Howard Beardsley (Frank's brother.)
 Nancy Howard as Nancy Beardsley (Frank's sister-in-law)
 Sidney Miller as Dr. Ashford (Helen's date)
 Louise Troy as Madeleine Love (Frank's date)
 Tom Bosley as a family doctor who makes a house call on the Beardsleys, and is also the consulting physician for the California Draft Board when Mike Beardsley reports for a required physical exam.
 Ben Murphy as Larry, Colleen's boyfriend

 Jennifer Gan as Young Lady In Coffeehouse
 Larry Hankin as Supermarket Clerk
 Mary Gregory as Sister Mary Alice, who questions Philip's use of the Beardsley name
 Harry Holcombe as the judge who handles the grand mutual adoption
 Ysabel MacCloskey as Nanny #1, who lasts less than a day.
Pauline Hague as Nanny #2, aka "Mrs. Anderson." She lasts a week because she is hiding from the police. After a stint with the Beardsleys, she turns herself in.
 Marjorie Eaton as Nanny #3, aka "Mrs. Ferguson," who famously says, "Mrs. Anderson was last week; I'm Mrs. Ferguson, and you can mail me my check!" She fights Louise precipitating Frank's second meeting with Helen.

The Beardsley Children
 Tim Matheson as Mike (credited as "Tim Matthieson")
 Gil Rogers as Rusty
 Gary Goetzman as Greg
 Nancy Roth as Rosemary
 Morgan Brittany as Louise (Credited as "Suzanne Cupito")
 Maralee Foster as Mary
 Holly O'Brien as Susan
 Michele Tobin as Veronica
 Tracy Nelson as Germaine
 Stephanie Oliver as Joan

The North Children
 Jennifer Leak as Colleen
 Kimberly Beck as Janette
 Kevin Burchett as Nick
 Mitch Vogel as Tommy
 Margot Jane as Jean
 Eric Shea as Philip
 Greg Atkins as Gerald
 Lynnell Atkins as Teresa

Reality versus film 
This film departs in several various ways from the actual lives of Frank and Helen Beardsley and their children. The names of Frank and Helen Beardsley and their children are real; the wedding invitation that appears midway through the film is the actual North-Beardsley wedding invitation. The career of Lieutenant Richard North USN is also described accurately, but briefly: specifically, he was a navigator on the crew of an A-3 Skywarrior that crashed in a routine training flight, killing all aboard, exactly as Helen describes in the film. Frank Beardsley is described correctly as a Navy warrant officer. The "loan-out" of the two youngest Beardsleys is also real, and indeed Michael, Charles ("Rusty"), and Gregory Beardsley were determined to see their father marry Helen North as a means of rectifying this situation. The movie correctly describes Frank Beardsley as applying his Navy mind-set to the daunting task of organizing such a large family (although the chart with the color-coded bathrooms and letter-coded bedrooms--"I'm Eleven Red A!"—is likely a Hollywood exaggeration). Finally, Michael Beardsley did indeed serve a term in the Marine Corps, as did Rusty.

The differences from what Helen Beardsley's book Who Gets the Drumstick? puts forth include the following:

 The film changes the ages and birth order of many of the children, and places some of the children, most notably Colleen and Philip North, into situations not mentioned in the book. For example, Colleen North is not mentioned in Beardsley's book as ever having a boyfriend who took inappropriate liberties with her.
 Contrary to the depiction in the film, Helen North and Frank Beardsley began their relationship by corresponding with each other in sympathy for their recent losses. Furthermore, each knew how many children the other had before their first meeting, which was not by accident in a Navy commissary; Frank's sister told Helen about Frank's situation and she wrote to him to offer her sympathy. On their first date, Helen made no attempt to hide her children from Frank.
 Frank Beardsley was a yeoman in the Navy and afterward the personnel officer at the Naval Postgraduate School in Monterey, California. He played no role in the development of the "meatball", nor is he listed as having served aboard any ship named USS Enterprise.
 Frank's friend "CWO Darrell Harrison USN", the character (portrayed by Van Johnson) who draws Frank and Helen together, was invented for the film. Helen Beardsley writes in Who Gets the Drumstick? that her own sister and brother-in-law played this role.
 Frank Beardsley never told his own story in print, and Helen provides very little description of his homelife before he married her; there is no mention of Frank's home not being exactly "shipshape", or his not being able to keep a housekeeper longer than a week.
 The couple who temporarily took care of Germaine and Joan Beardsley were not Frank's brother and sister-in-law as depicted in the film, but two unrelated friends of his.
 The North and Beardsley children received the prospect of Helen and Frank's marriage with enthusiasm and without reservation. When Helen visited Frank's home for the first time, she took her five oldest children along. They met some of their Beardsley counterparts and immediately became friends. From the moment that the prospect of Frank and Helen's marriage became real, the children all began regarding Frank and Helen as their parents and even pressured them to marry as soon as possible.
 The "drunken dinner scene" in which Mike, Rusty, and Greg Beardsley serve Helen North a double (or perhaps triple) screwdriver with Scotch and gin makes no appearance in the book. Rather, it takes advantage of Lucille Ball’s facility in playing drunk as in the "Lucy Does a TV Commercial" episode in Lucille Ball's television show I Love Lucy, in which she rehearses a television commercial for a vitamin elixir (Vitameatavegamin) with a high alcohol content. Two I Love Lucy writers who wrote that episode--Madelyn Davis and Bob Carroll—are given story credit in the film. 
 Mike, Rusty, and Greg observed "company manners" from the beginning of Helen's first visit to the Beardsley home. Helen describes their gestures as touching her greatly. The film does not depict this.
 The blended family did not move into a new home as shown in the film. Instead, Frank Beardsley had bedrooms and bathrooms added to his existing home, and Helen North sold her house when she and her children moved into his. (The leaking-roof scene is based on the incident that prompted Helen North to move to California from Whidbey Island.)
 The North boy who was determined to be bad because "the good die young" was actually Nicholas North, not Philip. It was also Nicholas whose teachers commanded him to use the North name after his mother's marriage although he preferred the Beardsley name. (However, the ruckus in the film—that a schoolteacher incites in her classroom over the naming issue—is also a dramatization.)
 Philip's idolization of Mike, and Mike's willingness to be a role model to Philip, are touched on in the book. However, all of Frank Beardsley's three eldest sons actually played this role. Likewise, all of Helen North's sons, not Philip alone, lionized Mike, as well as Rusty and Greg. The high mutual respect that the stepbrothers developed for one another was one of the most important developments that knit the blended family together. (In this regard, the petty jealousies between Frank's and Helen's children, as depicted in the film, are generally dramatic liberties.)
 The one incident of mutual jealousy that did develop in real life—between the eldest Beardsley and North daughters—is not depicted in the film.
 The children never objected to the massive cross-adoption. The chief objectors fell into two groups: Richard North's brother and some of his other relatives, who objected to the "erasure" of Mr. North's name; and a large number of readers of a major magazine (which Helen Beardsley never named) who objected in principle to the adoption when that magazine mistakenly reported it as an accomplished fact. However, Frank and Helen ultimately ignored those objections in the face of more pressing and important consequences of their having married without initially adopting each other's children.

The film also takes dramatic liberties with its depiction of Navy life and flight operations aboard an aircraft carrier:

 When Frank learns that Helen is pregnant (with Joseph John), he asks the catapult launch officer to stop the launch of the mail plane to permit him to board it; in reality, this officer does not have that authority. In fact, the Air Boss is the lowest-ranking officer who can stop the launch of an aircraft, and normally he does not keep station on the flight deck at all.
 Frank is seen wearing a ship's ballcap, and then a combination cap. Neither would be permitted, as they constitute a foreign object damage hazard. Additionally, no one would be permitted on the flight deck during active flight operations without wearing helmet, goggles, and ear plugs.

As much as this film departed from the Beardsleys' actual life, the 2005 remake departed even more significantly.

Production notes 
Henry Fonda and Lucille Ball take turns providing voice-over narration throughout—and in at least one scene, Van Johnson  talks directly to the camera, as does Fonda.

That Lucille Ball would portray Helen Beardsley was never in doubt. But a long line of distinguished actors came under consideration, at one time or another, for the role of Frank Beardsley. They included Desi Arnaz, James Stewart, Fred MacMurray, Jackie Gleason, Art Carney, and John Wayne. Henry Fonda finally accepted, and indeed asked for, the role in a telephone conversation with Robert F. Blumofe in 1967. Ball, who had worked with Fonda before in the 1942 release The Big Street, readily agreed to the casting.

One account says that Ball recalled in 1961 that Desilu Productions first bought the rights to the Beardsley-North story in 1959, even before Helen Beardsley published her biography, but this is highly unlikely because Frank and Helen Beardsley married on September 6, 1961, and their first spouses were both alive in 1959. More likely is the story that Bob Carroll and his wife brought the story of the Beardsley family to Ball's attention after reading it in a local newspaper. However, Mr. Carroll is said to recall his wife mentioning the story in 1960—again, a full year before the Beardsleys were married and probably when Dick North was still alive. In any event, Desilu Productions did secure the rights early on, and Mr. Carroll and Madelyn Pugh began instantly to write a script.

Production suffered multiple interruptions for several reasons. It began in December 1962 after Ball's abortive attempt at a career on the Broadway stage. In 1963, production was halted after the box-office failure of her comedy effort Critic's Choice (with Bob Hope). Later, she was unhappy with the script presented by Madelyn Pugh (then known as Madelyn Pugh Martin) and Bob Carroll, precisely because their script overly resembled an I Love Lucy television episode, and commissioned another writer (Leonard Spigelgass) to rewrite the script. Mr. Spigelgass does not seem to have succeeded in breaking free of Lucy's television work, so producer Robert Blumofe hired yet two more writers (Mickey Rudin and Bernie Weitzman) to make an attempt. When this failed, Blumofe hired Melville Shavelson, who eventually directed. All further rewrite efforts came to an abrupt end at the insistence of United Artists, the film's eventual distributor.

At this point in the production cycle, Helen Beardsley's book Who Gets the Drumstick? was actually released in 1965. Like many film adaptations, exactly how much the book informed the final shooting script is impossible to determine.

Production began in 1967 with Henry Fonda definitely signed on to portray Frank. Mort Lachman, who had been one of Bob Hope's writers, joined the writing team at the recommendation of Shavelson. Leonard Spigelgass received no on-screen writing credit for his efforts in this film.

Filming was done largely on-location in Alameda and San Francisco, California with Mike's high-school graduation being filmed at Grant High School in southern California (Frank Beardsley's home, into which the blended family eventually moved, was in Carmel). The total budget is estimated at $2.5 million (equivalent to $ million in ), including $1,700,000 for actual filming and post-production.

Reception 
The film received lukewarm critical reviews—although Leonard Maltin looked favorably upon it as a "wholesome, 'family' picture" with an excellent script. Roger Ebert gave the film 3.5 out of 4 stars and praised the performances of Ball and Fonda.

It was a massive commercial success, earning nearly $26 million ($182 Million adjusted for inflation) at the box office (on a tight budget of $2.5 million) and earning over $11 million in rentals. It was the top-grossing film released by United Artists in 1968. This came about probably on the strength of Lucille Ball's name and performance (which many of her fans regard as a classic). Some critics felt that Ball, then in her late 50s, was perhaps 15 years too old for the part of a middle-aged (presumably 40-ish) mother.

Frank Beardsley commented that his family enjoyed the film as general entertainment, and acknowledged that perhaps the scriptwriters felt that their screenplay was "a better story" than the truth.

Not anticipating the huge box office returns from the movie, Lucille Ball failed to make appropriate tax shelter and thus saw most of her share going to pay taxes.

The film's success partly inspired network approval of the television series The Brady Bunch; the original script for the series pilot was written well before this movie became a reality.

Among the child actors cast as the Beardsley and North children, several went on to greater success, including Tim Matheson (billed here as Tim Matthieson) who went on to play the character Otter in the more adult-oriented comedy Animal House; Morgan Brittany (billed here as Suzanne Cupito) played Katherine Wentworth in Dallas from 1981 to 1987; Mitch Vogel appeared in The Reivers with Steve McQueen for which Vogel received a Golden Globe Best Supporting Actor nomination in 1970; and Tracy Nelson, daughter of actor/musician Ricky Nelson, who eventually starred in the series Father Dowling Mysteries beside Tom Bosley, who portrayed the doctor in this movie. Also, Matheson (Mike Beardsley) and future soap-opera actress Jennifer Leak (Colleen North) married in real life in 1968, although they divorced in 1971.

The film holds a 50% approval rating with 12 reviews from critics on Rotten Tomatoes.

Home media
Yours, Mine and Ours was released on VHS by MGM/UA Home Video in 1989, 1994, and 1998. A Laserdisc version was released in 1994, featuring noise reduction applied to the film soundtrack.

It was released to DVD on March 6, 2001. While the DVD was released in full frame, the original film was a widescreen release in the 1.78:1 aspect ratio; this, therefore, constitutes an open matte presentation.

It was released on Blu-ray on September 13, 2016 through Olive Films (under license from MGM and 20th Century Fox Home Entertainment). The sole special feature is the original movie trailer.

Awards and nominations

See also
 List of American films of 1968

References

External links
 
 
 
 
 "Official" site of the actual family of Frank and Helen Beardsley, a valuable reference that includes key differences between Helen Beardsley's biography and the films.

1968 films
1968 comedy-drama films
1960s American films
1960s English-language films
American comedy-drama films
American films based on actual events
Films directed by Melville Shavelson
Films set in the San Francisco Bay Area
Films about the United States Navy
Films about weddings
Films about marriage
Films about families
Films about widowhood
Films about parenting
Films scored by Fred Karlin
Love stories
United Artists films